Rukn ad-Dīn ʿAlī Mardān Khaljī was a 13th-century governor of Bengal, a member of the Khalji dynasty of Bengal.

Early life
He was a son of Mardan Khalji of the Khalaj tribe, a tribe of Turkic origin that after migration from Turkistan had later settled in Afghanistan for over 200 years before entering South Asia.

Career
Ali Mardan Khalji returned to Bengal in 1210 and replaced Iwaz Khalji as the region's governor. However, he only ruled for two years as his cruelty and brutality produced disgust among the courtiers. Some of his actions included banishing popular nobles from Bengal who he did not get along with. The Khalji nobles plotted against him and he was assassinated by them in 1212, and Iwaz Khalji was restored as Bengal's governor.

See also

List of rulers of Bengal
History of Bengal
History of Bangladesh
History of India

References

Governors of Bengal
1212 deaths
Year of birth unknown